Cephalops is a genus of flies belonging to the family Pipunculidae.

The genus has cosmopolitan distribution.

Species
Cephalops abditus (Hardy, 1949)
Cephalops acklandi Kozánek & De Meyer, 1992
Cephalops acrothrix (Perkins, 1910)
Cephalops adamanteus De Meyer & Kozánek, 1990
Cephalops aeneus Fallén, 1810
Cephalops albivillosus (Hardy, 1949)
Cephalops alienus (Hardy, 1953)
Cephalops amapaensis Rafael, 1991
Cephalops amembranosus Rafael, 1991
Cephalops amplus (Hardy, 1964)
Cephalops apletomeris (Hardy, 1964)
Cephalops argenteus Kuznetzov, 1991
Cephalops argutus (Hardy, 1968)
Cephalops ariadneae De Meyer, 1992
Cephalops artifrons (Hardy, 1968)
Cephalops bellulus (Hardy, 1949)
Cephalops bequaerti (Curran, 1929)
Cephalops bicuspidis (Hardy, 1964)
Cephalops bifidus De Meyer & Grootaert, 1990
Cephalops boharti (Hardy, 1949)
Cephalops brasiliensis (Hardy, 1950)
Cephalops buclavus (Hardy, 1968)
Cephalops burmensis De Meyer, 1992
Cephalops caeruleimontanus De Meyer, 1992
Cephalops calcaratus (Hardy, 1949)
Cephalops callistus (Hardy, 1954)
Cephalops calvus (De Meyer, 1990)
Cephalops candidulus (Hardy, 1949)
Cephalops canutifrons (Hardy, 1964)
Cephalops carinatus (Verrall, 1901)
Cephalops cautus (Hardy, 1952)
Cephalops chandiensis (Kapoor, Grewal & Sharma, 1987)
Cephalops chauliosternum (Hardy, 1964)
Cephalops cochleatus De Meyer, 1992
Cephalops congoensis (Hardy, 1949)
Cephalops conjunctivus Collin, 1958
Cephalops cornutus (Hardy, 1953)
Cephalops crassispinus Yang & Xu, 1998
Cephalops curtifrons Coe, 1966
Cephalops curvarmatus De Meyer, 1990
Cephalops delomeris (Hardy, 1964)
Cephalops deminitens (Hardy, 1966)
Cephalops digitatus De Meyer, 1990
Cephalops emeljanovi Kuznetzov, 1990
Cephalops eufraternus (Kapoor, Grewal & Sharma, 1987)
Cephalops euryhymenos (Hardy, 1964)
Cephalops excellens (Kertész, 1912)
Cephalops eximius (Hardy, 1972)
Cephalops extimus (Hardy, 1952)
Cephalops filicicola (Hardy, 1964)
Cephalops flaviventris De Meyer, 1992
Cephalops flavocinctus (Brunetti, 1912)
Cephalops fraternus (Kertész, 1912)
Cephalops furnaceus De Meyer, 1990
Cephalops gansuensis Yang & Xu, 1998
Cephalops gnomus (Hardy, 1964)
Cephalops gracilentus Yang & Xu, 1998
Cephalops grandimembranus De Meyer, 1989
Cephalops grootaerti De Meyer, 1990
Cephalops haleakalaae (Hardy, 1953)
Cephalops hardyi De Meyer, 1990
Cephalops hawaiiensis (Perkins, 1905)
Cephalops hemistilbus (Hardy, 1961)
Cephalops hirtifemurus Yang & Xu, 1998
Cephalops holomelas (Perkins, 1910)
Cephalops huashanensis (Yang & Xu, 1989)
Cephalops imperfectus Becker, 1921
Cephalops inchoatus (Hardy, 1949)
Cephalops incohatus Morakote, 1990
Cephalops inflatus De Meyer, 1992
Cephalops injectivus (Hardy, 1964)
Cephalops innitidus Rafael, 1991
Cephalops inpaganus Rafael, 1991
Cephalops javensis De Meyer, 1992
Cephalops juvator (Perkins, 1905)
Cephalops juvencus (Hardy, 1964)
Cephalops kalimus (Hardy, 1962)
Cephalops kashmerensis (Kapoor, Grewal & Sharma, 1987)
Cephalops koolauensis (Hardy, 1964)
Cephalops kumaonensis (Kapoor, Grewal & Sharma, 1987)
Cephalops kumatai Morakote, 1990
Cephalops kunashiricus Kuznetzov, 1990
Cephalops kurilensis Kuznetzov, 1990
Cephalops laeviventris (Loew, 1858)
Cephalops laterisutilis (Hardy, 1964)
Cephalops libidinosus De Meyer, 1991
Cephalops limatus (Hardy, 1965)
Cephalops longicaudus Yang & Xu, 1998
Cephalops longiductulis De Meyer, 1990
Cephalops longipennis (Brunetti, 1927)
Cephalops longisetosus (Hardy, 1950)
Cephalops longistigmatis Yang & Xu, 1998
Cephalops longistylis De Meyer, 1990
Cephalops lubuti (Curran, 1929)
Cephalops lucidus (Hardy, 1950)
Cephalops lusingensis (Hardy, 1952)
Cephalops lusitanicus Kehlmaier & Andrade, 2016
Cephalops macrothrix (Hardy, 1964)
Cephalops maculiventris (Brunetti, 1927)
Cephalops magnimembrus De Meyer, 1992
Cephalops mainensis (Cresson, 1911)
Cephalops mashobraensis (Kapoor, Grewal & Sharma, 1987)
Cephalops megameris (Hardy, 1964)
Cephalops melanopodis (Hardy, 1953)
Cephalops metallicus Morakote, 1990
Cephalops molokaiensis (Grimshaw, 1901)
Cephalops multidenticulatus De Meyer & Grootaert, 1990
Cephalops mundulus (Hardy, 1968)
Cephalops nagatomii (Hardy, 1972)
Cephalops navus (Hardy, 1952)
Cephalops nigricoxa Rafael, 1991
Cephalops nigrifrons Rafael, 1991
Cephalops nigronitens (Brunetti, 1912)
Cephalops nigrotarsatus (Grimshaw, 1901)
Cephalops nitidellus Rafael, 1991
Cephalops nitidus (Hardy, 1950)
Cephalops oahuensis (Perkins, 1905)
Cephalops oberon Coe, 1966
Cephalops obscuratus (Hardy, 1953)
Cephalops obstipus (Hardy, 1964)
Cephalops obtusinervis (Zetterstedt, 1844)
Cephalops obtusus (Hardy, 1949)
Cephalops orbiculatus Yang & Xu, 1998
Cephalops orestes (Hardy, 1972)
Cephalops pacatus Morakote, 1990
Cephalops paganus (Hardy, 1965)
Cephalops palawanensis (Hardy, 1972)
Cephalops pallidipleura (Curran, 1929)
Cephalops pallidivittipes De Meyer, 1990
Cephalops pallipes (Johnson, 1903)
Cephalops pannonicus (Aczél, 1939)
Cephalops papuaensis De Meyer & Grootaert, 1990
Cephalops parmatus De Meyer & Grootaert, 1990
Cephalops pauculus (Hardy, 1954)
Cephalops pedernalensis Rafael, 1996
Cephalops pendleburyi (Brunetti, 1927)
Cephalops penepauculus (Hardy, 1965)
Cephalops penultimus Ackland, 1993
Cephalops perkinsiellae (Hardy, 1953)
Cephalops perpaucus (Hardy, 1950)
Cephalops perspicuus (Meijere, 1907)
Cephalops phaethus (Hardy & Knowlton, 1939)
Cephalops philippinensis (Hardy, 1949)
Cephalops ponti Rafael, 1991
Cephalops proditus (Hardy, 1964)
Cephalops pulvillatus (Kertész, 1915)
Cephalops quasilubuti (Hardy, 1962)
Cephalops robustus De Meyer, 1992
Cephalops rotundipennis (Grimshaw, 1901)
Cephalops ruandensis (Hardy, 1950)
Cephalops saegeri (Hardy, 1961)
Cephalops sectus (Hardy, 1964)
Cephalops seminitidus (Becker, 1897)
Cephalops shikotanicus Kuznetzov, 1990
Cephalops shisanlingensis Yang & Xu, 1998
Cephalops signatus (Becker, 1900)
Cephalops spirellus Huo & Yang, 2017
Cephalops splendens De Meyer, 1992
Cephalops straminipes (Becker, 1900)
Cephalops stygius (Hardy, 1948)
Cephalops subultimus Collin, 1956
Cephalops swezeyi (Perkins, 1905)
Cephalops taiwanensis De Meyer, 1992
Cephalops talyshensis Kuznetzov, 1990
Cephalops terraereginensis De Meyer, 1992
Cephalops terryi (Perkins, 1905)
Cephalops tibetanus (Yang & Xu, 1987)
Cephalops timberlakei (Hardy, 1953)
Cephalops titania Coe, 1966
Cephalops titanus (Hardy, 1964)
Cephalops transversalis Rafael, 1991
Cephalops trichostylis (Hardy, 1964)
Cephalops turkmenorum Kuznetzov, 1990
Cephalops ugandensis De Meyer, 1992
Cephalops ultimus (Becker, 1900)
Cephalops uluhe (Hardy, 1953)
Cephalops validus (Hardy, 1972)
Cephalops varipes (Meigen, 1824)
Cephalops varius (Cresson, 1911)
Cephalops villifemoralis (Hardy, 1954)
Cephalops villosiscutum (Hardy, 1962)
Cephalops vinnulus (Hardy, 1949)
Cephalops visendus (Hardy, 1950)
Cephalops vittipes (Zetterstedt, 1844)
Cephalops xanthocnemis (Perkins, 1905)
Cephalops yoshiyasui Morakote, 1990
Cephalops zululandicus (Hardy, 1949)

References

Pipunculidae
Brachycera genera
Diptera of Europe
Taxa named by Carl Fredrik Fallén